The 1979 Japan Open Tennis Championships, also known by its sponsorship name Hit-Union Japan Open Tennis Championships, was a combined men's and women's tennis tournament played on outdoor clay courts in Tokyo, Japan that was part of the Colgate Series and the Volvo Grand Prix circuit. The tournament was held from 22 October through 28 October 1979. Terry Moor (ninth-seeded) and Betsy Nagelsen won the singles titles.

Finals

Men's singles
 Terry Moor defeated  Pat Du Pré 3–6, 7–6, 6–2
It was Moor's 1st title of the year and the 1st of his career.

Women's singles
 Betsy Nagelsen defeated  Naoko Sato 6–1, 3–6, 6–3
 It was Nagelsen's 2nd title of the year and the 2nd of her career.

Men's doubles
 Colin Dibley /  Pat Du Pré defeated  Rod Frawley /  Francisco González 3–6, 6–1, 6–1

Women's doubles
 Betsy Nagelsen /  Penny Johnson defeated  Yu Li-Chiao /  Chen Chuan 3–6, 6–4, 7–5

References

External links
 Official website
  Association of Tennis Professionals (ATP) tournament profile

Japan Open Tennis Championships
Japan Open Tennis Championships
Japan Open Tennis Championships
Japan Open Tennis Championships
Japan Open (tennis)